Simutronics is an American online games company whose products include GemStone IV and DragonRealms.  It was founded in 1987 by David Whatley, with husband and wife Tom & Susan Zelinski. The company is located in St. Louis, Missouri. It became part of the Stillfront Group in 2016.

The company's flagship product is the text based game, GemStone IV, which went live in November 2003, with predecessor games running back in 1988. GemStone was originally accessed through General Electric's internet service provider GEnie, later becoming accessible through AOL, Prodigy, and CompuServe before Simutronics finally moved all their games to their own domain in 1997.

Simutronics products

Multiplayer online games
 GemStone IV, Simutronics' flagship product, a text-based multiplayer fantasy game, which has seen over one million users over the years. It is the longest-lived commercial MUD game, followed by Avalon: The Legend Lives.
 DragonRealms, a 1996 MUD set in GemStone Elanthia world, with popularity on online services AOL, Compuserve, and Prodigy. In comparison with GemStone, DragonRealms has more skill-based gameplay.
 CyberStrike, also known as CyberStrike Classic, a graphical futuristic ship combat game. It won the first ever "Online Game of the Year" award from Computer Gaming World magazine in 1993.
 Dragons of Elanthia (currently in Beta), a multiplayer third-person shooter in which players select different dragons and riders, each with unique abilities, to fight each other.

Mobile games
 Tiny Heroes, a tower defense game for iPhone and iPad, released in 2011
 One Epic Knight, an endless runner game, released in 2012 for iOS devices and in 2013 for Android

HeroEngine

HeroEngine is a 3D game engine and server technology platform developed specifically for building MMO-style games, based around a system similar to the IFE using the Hero Script Language (HSL). Originally developed for the company's own game Hero's Journey - which never made it to the testing stage - the engine has since been licensed by other companies.  Simutronics sold the HeroEngine to Idea Fabrik, Plc. on August 5, 2010.

References

Sources

External links
 Simutronics company website
 Play.net, Simutronics on-line games website
 Simutronics profile from MobyGames
 Simutronics profile from IGN
 Simutronics profile from Giant Bomb

Companies based in St. Louis
Companies established in 1987
MUD organizations
Video game companies of the United States
Mobile game companies